Vicente do Espirito Santo, O.A.D. (1730–1788) was a Roman Catholic prelate who served as the first Prelate of Goiás (1782–1788) and Bishop of São Tomé e Príncipe (1778–1782).

Biography
Vicente do Espirito Santo was born in Belém, Portugal on 15 Oct 1730 and ordained a deacon in the Order of Discalced Augustinians on 22 Sep 1754 and ordained a priest on 29 Sep 1754.
On 30 Dec 1778, he was selected as Bishop of São Tomé e Príncipe and confirmed by Pope Pius VI on 1 Mar 1779.
On 30 Nov 1779, he was consecrated bishop by Antonio Bonifacio Coelho, Titular Archbishop of Lacedaemonia, with Francisco de São Simão, Bishop of Santiago de Cabo Verde, and Domingos da Encarnação Pontével, Bishop of Mariana, serving as co-consecrators. 
On 25 Nov 1782, he resigned as Bishop of São Tomé e Príncipe and shortly after was appointed by Pope Pius VI as the first Prelate of Goiás on 17 Dec 1782.
He served as Prelate of Goiás until his death on 29 Nov 1788.

Episcopal succession

References 

18th-century Roman Catholic bishops in São Tomé and Príncipe
Bishops appointed by Pope Pius VI
1730 births
1788 deaths
People from Lisbon
Discalced Augustinian bishops
18th-century Roman Catholic bishops in Brazil
Portuguese Roman Catholic bishops in South America
Roman Catholic bishops of São Tomé and Príncipe
Roman Catholic bishops of Goiás